Acral arteriolar ectasia is characterized by purple serpiginous ectatic arterioles on the back of the fingers, presenting in the fifth decade of life.

A distinct vascular malformation, to our knowledge not described before, is reported. The malformation consists of purple serpiginous vessels on the dorsa of the digits, first arising in the fifth decade of life. The vessels are ectatic arterioles and are believed to represent a rare vascular malformation.

See also 
 List of cutaneous conditions

References

 
Dermal and subcutaneous growths